The 1710s BC was a decade lasting from January 1, 1719 BC to December 31, 1710 BC.

Events and trends
 1712 BC–According to the middle chronology, Samsu-iluna dies and is succeeded by Abi-Eshuh.

Significant people
 Rim-Sin I, ruler of the Middle Eastern city-state of Larsa
 Samsu-iluna, king of Babylon since 1750 BC

References

18th century BC